The Northeastern Brazil restingas are an ecoregion of northeastern Brazil. Restingas are coastal forests which form along coastal sand dunes in Brazil.  The soils are typically sandy, acidic, and nutrient-poor, and are characterized by medium-sized trees and shrubs adapted to local conditions.  Restingas have aspects of mangroves, caatingas, wetlands, and moist forests, often forming along wind-driven sand dunes.  The Northeast Brazil restingas are the most northerly of the forest type in Brazil.

Location and Description
The ecoregion extends 400 km along the northeast Atlantic coast of Brazil, and up to 100 km inland.  This covers an area of  along oasts of eastern Maranhão, Piauí, and western Ceará states. The ecoregion includes the Lençóis Maranhenses National Park, where patches of restinga are interspersed with some of the most extensive coastal dunes in the world.  The dune systems reflect the forces of tides that vary 6 meters.

Climate
The climate of the ecoregion is Tropical savanna climate - dry summer (Köppen climate classification (As)).  This climate is characterized by relatively even temperatures throughout the year, and a pronounced dry season.  The driest month has less than 60 mm of precipitation, and is drier than the average month.

Flora and fauna
The area is a patchwork of habitat types.  29% of the area has herbaceous cover, including  beach morning glory (Ipomoea imperati), seashore dropseed, and Iresine as pioneer species on the dunes of the northwest.  Sedge and panic grass are found on the floodplains.  20% of the cover is shrub, dominating in the caatingas of the drier eastern portions of the ecoregion.  34% of the cover is forest, split roughly equally between open and closed canopy.  The moist forests are found along the inland edge and in the southwest. The flora of the Northeastern Brazil restingas includes many species with affinities to the Amazon biome, which distinguishes them from the Atlantic Coast restingas of Brazil's eastern coast, whose flora is mostly derived from the Atlantic Forest of eastern Brazil.  

The Scarlet ibis is a well-known feature of the inter-dune lakes and wetlands of this area.  Recent conservation efforts have also focused on protecting the nesting sites of sea turtles.

Protected areas
Over 29% of the ecoregion is located in an officially protected area, including:
 Lençóis Maranhenses National Park, at the western edge of the ecoregion, at the Baía de São José

External links

References

Ecoregions of Brazil
Environment of Ceará
Environment of Maranhão
Environment of Piauí
Forests of Brazil
Amazon biome
Geography of Ceará
Geography of Maranhão
Geography of Piauí
Neotropical tropical and subtropical moist broadleaf forests